Pishavak (also Romanized as Pīshāvak and Pīshāvok; also known as Pashāvak) is a village in Bizaki Rural District, Golbajar District, Chenaran County, Razavi Khorasan Province, Iran. At the 2006 census, its population was 35, in 10 families.

References 

Populated places in Chenaran County